Jean-Paul "J.P." LeBlanc (born October 20, 1946) is a Canadian retired professional ice hockey centre.

Career 
LeBlanc played 153 games in the National Hockey League and 248 games in the World Hockey Association between 1969 and 1979. During his career, he was a member of the Chicago Black Hawks, Los Angeles Sharks, Michigan Stags, Baltimore Blades, Denver Spurs, Ottawa Civics and Detroit Red Wings.

Career statistics

Regular season and playoffs

External links
 

1946 births
Living people
Adirondack Red Wings players
Baltimore Blades players
Canadian ice hockey centres
Chicago Blackhawks players
Columbus Checkers players
Dallas Black Hawks players
Denver Spurs (WHA) players
Detroit Red Wings players
Ice hockey people from Quebec
Kansas City Red Wings players
Los Angeles Sharks players
Michigan Stags players
Ottawa Civics players
People from Centre-du-Québec
Portland Buckaroos players
St. Catharines Black Hawks players